The 1987 Tour of the Basque Country was the 27th edition of the Tour of the Basque Country cycle race and was held from 6 April to 10 April 1987. The race started in Zarautz and finished in Arantzazu. The race was won by Sean Kelly of the Kas team.

General classification

References

1987
Bas